The Electoral Office for Northern Ireland (EONI) is an independent, non-partisan body which assists the Chief Electoral Officer for Northern Ireland in running elections and compiling the electoral register.

See also 
Elections in Northern Ireland

Elections in Northern Ireland